Two bronze statues of Joseph Smith and his brother Hyrum Smith are located at Temple Square in Downtown Salt Lake City, Utah.

They were created in 1907 by Mahonri Young using the death masks of Joseph and Hyrum. They were originally located next to the doors of the Salt Lake Temple, but in 1911 they were moved to a more prominent positions between the Visitor center and the Temple.

Joseph was the founder and first Prophet/President of the Church of Jesus Christ of Latter-day Saints and his brother was the Presiding Patriarch. They were both killed by a mob June 27, 1844.

See also 

 1907 in art
 Temple Square

References 

Outdoor sculptures in Salt Lake City
Temple Square
Works about Joseph Smith
Statues of religious leaders